, nicknamed "Shotime", is a Japanese professional baseball pitcher, designated hitter and outfielder for the Los Angeles Angels of Major League Baseball (MLB). He previously played for the Hokkaido Nippon-Ham Fighters of Nippon Professional Baseball's (NPB) Pacific League.

Ohtani was the first pick of the Fighters in the 2012 draft. He played in NPB for the Fighters from 2013 through 2017 as a pitcher and an outfielder. The record was broken by Thyago Vieira five years later, but he still holds the Japanese record. The Fighters posted Ohtani to MLB after the 2017 season, and he signed with the Angels. He won the 2018 American League (AL) Rookie of the Year Award and the 2021 AL Most Valuable Player Award. Ohtani's 2021 season was formally recognized as "historically significant" and a "major impact on the sport" by MLB Commissioner Rob Manfred, as he became the first two-way player in the history of MLB with 10+ home runs and 20+ stolen bases as a hitter and 100+ strikeouts and 10+ pitching appearances as a pitcher in the same season while also holding at least a share of the major league lead in home runs in fourteen starts. He was also the first player in MLB history to be an All-Star as both a pitcher and a hitter, as he was a starter in the 2021 All-Star Game in both capacities, as the AL's manager-selected starting pitcher (earning the win) and fan-elected starting designated hitter (as the leadoff hitter). 

In 2022, Ohtani became the first player in the modern era to qualify for both the hitting and pitching leaderboards in one season, reaching the limits of 3.1 plate appearances and one inning pitched per game with 586 at bats against 166 innings pitched.

Early life
Ohtani was born to Kayoko and Toru Ohtani in Ōshū, Iwate, Japan, on July 5, 1994. His mother, Kayoko, was a national-level badminton player in high school and his father worked at a local automobile manufacturing plant and was an amateur baseball player who played in the Japanese Industrial League. The youngest of three children, he has one older sister, Yuka, and one older brother Ryuta, who is also an amateur baseball player in the Japanese Industrial League. In Japan, Ohtani was known as a ""—a kid who lives, eats and breathes baseball. Coached by his father, he displayed an aptitude for the game at an early age. He began playing baseball in his second year of elementary school, and as a seventh-grader, Ohtani recorded all but one of 18 outs in a six-inning regional championship game.

Amateur career
As a teenager, Ohtani could have played baseball for any powerhouse high school team in big cities such as Osaka or Yokohama. Instead, he opted to stay local, selecting Hanamaki Higashi High School in Iwate Prefecture, Northern Japan, the same high school as pitcher Yusei Kikuchi, whom he admired; Ohtani competed there as a swimmer and played baseball. Ohtani's high school baseball coach, Hiroshi Sasaki, said that he was a fast swimmer who "could have made the Olympics."

Under Sasaki's guidance, Hanamaki Higashi's players lived on campus, returning home for only six days a year. Sasaki would assign toilet cleaning chores to Ohtani, to teach the youth pitcher humility. Ohtani threw a  fastball as an 18-year-old high school pitcher. He threw the pitch in the Japanese national high school baseball championship tournament, commonly called Summer Koshien. In the 2012 18U Baseball World Championship, Ohtani had an 0–1 win–loss record with 16 strikeouts, eight walks, five hits, five runs, and a 4.35 earned run average (ERA) in  innings pitched.

Professional career
Ohtani expressed a desire to move directly to the major leagues after high school and received interest from numerous teams including the Texas Rangers, Boston Red Sox, New York Yankees and Los Angeles Dodgers. On October 21, 2012, he announced that he would pursue a career in Major League Baseball rather than turn professional in Japan. The Hokkaido Nippon-Ham Fighters decided to draft him in the 2012 NPB Draft nevertheless, despite knowing that there was a high likelihood he would not play for them. After an exclusive negotiating window between him and the Fighters, Ohtani announced that he would sign with the Fighters and spend some years in Japan before a possible MLB move. Hokkaido said it would allow Ohtani to serve as a pitcher and position player; the Los Angeles Dodgers, who had become Ohtani's top-choice MLB team, were not prepared to let him play both ways. He was assigned the jersey number 11, previously worn by Yu Darvish.

Hokkaido Nippon-Ham Fighters

Rookie year (2013)
Ohtani made his debut at age 18 in the Fighters' season-opening game on March 29, 2013, playing as a right fielder. He was selected for a Pacific League roster spot for the 2013 All-Star Game. As a pitcher, he finished the season with a 3–0 record in 11 starts. Ohtani was used as a rookie in both the outfield (leading the Fighters with 51 games in right) and as a pitcher. He was the second Nippon Pro Baseball rookie drafted out of high school the previous year to be used as both a pitcher and position player, following Kikuo Tokunaga in 1951; Ohtani was the first to start in both roles. He was the first NPB pitcher since Takao Kajimoto in 1963 to bat 3rd, 4th or 5th and the first rookie hurler to do so since Junzo Sekine in 1950. He was the second player, following Osamu Takechi (also 1950), to start a game at pitcher, bat in the heart of the order (3rd through 5th) and get a hit and a run batted in (RBI) in that game. He missed time during the year with a right ankle sprain and right cheekbone fracture.

For the season, he was 3–0 with a 4.23 ERA, 33 walks, and 46 strikeouts in  innings. and hit .238/.284/.376 in 204 plate appearances. He had seven outfield assists to one error. His 8 hit batsmen tied Manabu Mima, Tadashi Settsu, Hideaki Wakui and Ryoma Nogami for 5th in the 2013 Pacific League. Ohtani received 4 of the 233 votes for the 2013 Nippon Professional Baseball Rookie of the Year Award (Pacific League), tying Tatsuya Sato for a distant second behind Takahiro Norimoto. During his five-year tenure with the Fighters, Ohtani opted to live in the team's provided dormitories, while his parents oversaw his personal finances.

Second NPB All-Star selection (2014)

Throughout the entire season, Ohtani performed double-duty as a pitcher and outfielder, utilizing his strong throwing arm as well as his impressive batting skills. As a hitter, he batted .274, with 28 extra-base hits (including 10 home runs), 31 RBIs and a .842 on-base plus slugging percentage in 212 at-bats. As a pitcher, he was 11–4 with a 2.61 ERA in 24 starts and struck out 179 (third in NPB) in 155.1 innings. His 10.4 K/9 was the best in the league and opponents hit just .223 against him.

In a September 7 game against the Orix Buffaloes, he homered to straightaway center at Kyocera Dome to become the first Japanese player to reach double digits in both home runs and wins. He tossed a 1–0 shutout against Orix on September 13 and became the first pitcher out of high school to record a 1–0 shutout victory within his first two years for the Fighters since Toshiaki Moriyasu in 1967. He also became the first pitcher out of high school to notch two shutout victories within his first two years in the NPB since Yu Darvish.

During the July 2014 Mazda All-Star Game, he threw a  fastball in the bottom of the first inning, setting a new record for the fastest official pitch thrown by a Japanese pitcher, beating the record set by the Yakult Swallows' Yoshinori Sato in 2010. The jersey he wore during the game sold for 1,752,000 yen ($), making it the top-seller at the All-Star 2014 Charity Auction. The proceeds were donated to three Tohoku earthquake children's relief funds.

On October 5 against the Tohoku Rakuten Golden Eagles, Ohtani recorded the fastest pitch by a Japanese pitcher in an official game, tying Marc Kroon's all-time record for NPB pitchers. The pitch came against lead-off hitter Akaminai Ginji in the 1st inning. With the count 0–1, Ohtani threw a fastball that registered  on the stadium radar gun and shattered Ginji's bat in half. He also hit 162 km/h twice against the second hitter, Aoi Enomoto. Of the 15 pitches he threw in the first inning, eight were in the 160s; 99s in MPH.

During the postseason, Ohtani was chosen to become a member of the national team, dubbed Samurai Japan, and participated in the Suzuki All-Star Series, a five-game friendly competition with a squad of major leaguers. In Game 1, he pitched one shutout inning in relief, retiring three consecutive batters. He started Game 5 at the Sapporo Dome and, although his team ultimately lost (3–1), he wasn't charged with an earned run (he gave up two unearned), and of the 12 outs he recorded in four innings, he got seven via strikeout.

In December, he became the second player out of high school in NPB history to reach 100M yen in salary in his third year, after Daisuke Matsuzaka in 2001. His new contract more than tripled his previous salary estimated at 30M yen.

Pacific League Pitcher Best Nine and ERA leader (2015)
2015 marked Ohtani's third professional season (and second full season). Though his offensive production declined somewhat (five home runs), his performance on the mound was among the best in the league, earning him the starter role in the 2015 All-Star Game and the pitching spot in the end-of-year Pacific League Best Nine awards. Ohtani started 2015 NPB All-Star Game 1 for the PL. He went two innings and fanned two, allowing one run (on a double by Yoshitomo Tsutsugo and a single by Jose Lopez), relieved by Nishi with a 1–0 deficit. The PL would lose 8–6 but he got a no-decision. He finished the season 15–5 with a 2.24 ERA, 196 strikeouts and only 100 hits in  innings. He led the PL in ERA (.14 over Nishi), tied Wakui for the most wins and was second in strikeouts (19 behind Norimoto, though he threw 34 fewer innings). He rarely played the field but did see some action at DH, hitting .202/.252/.376 with five home runs in 109 at bats. He made the Best Nine as the PL's top hurler. He finished third in MVP voting again, placing behind Yanagita and Shogo Akiyama for the 2015 Pacific League MVP. Ohtani placed third in MVP voting (first among pitchers) and was one of three candidates considered for the 2015 Sawamura Award, given annually to the top pitcher in either league.

Ohtani led the league in wins and winning percentage with a 15–5 record in just 22 starts, and his 2.24 ERA, five complete games, and three shutouts were also best in the league. All these stats were career bests, as were his 196 strikeouts, 0.909 WHIP, and 11 strikeouts per nine innings.

Ohtani was dominant for the Japanese national team in the 2015 Premier 12. He hit 100 mph while blowing away eventual champion South Korea (10 K, 2 H, 2 BB, 0 R in 6 IP) before Norimoto relieved. Facing South Korea again in the semifinals, he was even sharper (11 K, 0 BB, 1 HB, 1 H in 7 IP). He did not give up a hit until Keun-woo Jeong singled in the seventh inning and had the most whiffs in a game for the first Premier 12 ever. Norimoto relieved with a 3–0 lead but he and two other relievers combined to allow four in the 9th to blow it as Japan fell in a shocking defeat. He led the event in ERA (Scott Diamond had 12 innings with a 0.00 ERA to Ohtani's 13) and strikeouts (one ahead of Chun-Lin Kuo) while allowing the lowest average by a starting pitcher. He was named the All-Star SP for the event (Sho Nakata was the only other member of Samurai Japan to be picked for the All-Star team).

Pacific League Most Valuable Player and first Japan Professional Sports Grand Prize (2016)
In 104 games and 382 plate appearances in 2016, Ohtani hit 22 home runs. He also hit 18 doubles, 67 RBI, batted .322 with an OBP of .416, scored 65 runs and had seven stolen bases. He won the Best Nine award as the designated hitter. Ohtani was the same dominant pitcher on the mound. In 21 games pitched, he had a career low in ERA at 1.86. He had a 10–4 record, struck out 174 batters in 140 innings with 4 complete games and one shutout. He also won the Best Nine award as a pitcher and won the Pacific League MVP. He got nearly double as many votes as any other pitcher for the PL for the 2016 NPB All-Star Game; he had 300,025 while #2 Shota Takeda had 158,008. He could not pitch in the event due to a blister on his finger but wound up starring as a designated hitter (DH). In Game 1, he batted for DH Yuya Hasegawa and lined out in the 8th against Scott Mathieson. Starting at DH and hitting 5th in Game 2, he homered off Shoichi Ino in the 5th to start the PL comeback from a 3–0 deficit. He singled against Ryo Akiyoshi in the 7th and scored on a hit by Kenta Imamiya for a 4–3 lead. Coming up with a 5–4 deficit in the 8th, he singled off Shinji Tajima to bring in Shogo Akiyama with the tying run. He thus produced three of the PL's five runs in the 5–5 tie, earning him game MVP honors. He hit 165 km/h (102.5 mph) on the radar gun during the year, setting a new NPB record.

He finished the year at .322/.416/.588 with 22 home runs in 382 plate appearances on offense and a 10–4 record and 1.86 ERA on the mound with 174 strikeouts in 140 innings. He tied for 8th in the PL in wins and was third in strikeouts (behind Norimoto and Kodai Senga).

He led Nippon Ham to the 2016 Japan Series, but lost the opener to the Hiroshima Carp; he fanned 11 in 6 innings but allowed 3 runs, two on a homer by Brad Eldred and one on a steal of home by Seiya Suzuki. Down 2 games to 0, he came up big as the DH in Game 3, getting three hits, a run, and an RBI. In the bottom of the 10th, he singled off Daichi Osera score Nishikawa with the winner; Nippon Ham would take the next three games to win their second Japan Series title. Teammate Brandon Laird would win the Series MVP. Ohtani hit .375/.412/.625 with four doubles, doing more on offense than on the mound for the Series.

He made the Best Nine as the top pitcher and top DH in the PL. He became the first player to receive the awards as both a pitcher and a hitter. He topped four-time Cuban MVP Alfredo Despaigne easily at DH (190 votes to 47; three others combined for eight votes) but the vote at pitcher was closer (he had 111 of 245 votes, Ishikawa 69 and Tsuyoshi Wada 61). He was the runaway winner of the 2016 Pacific League Most Valuable Player Award, getting 253 of 254 first-place votes (Naoki Miyanishi got the other one) and one second-place vote. He had 1,268 vote points, to 298 for runner-up Laird.

2017
In 2017, he played in 65 games, hitting .332 with eight homers and 31 RBIs while posting a 3–2 record, a 3.20 ERA, and 29 strikeouts as a pitcher. In September, it was revealed that Ohtani would ask to be posted at the end of the season in order to play in Major League Baseball in 2018. However, before that could happen, he had surgery on his right ankle in early October. The injury had originally occurred in the 2016 Japan Series, and had cost him a chance to play in the 2017 World Baseball Classic in addition to restricting his playing time during the season. On November 21, 2017, MLB and NPB came to a posting agreement for Ohtani.

Because he was under 25 years old, Ohtani was subjected to international signing rules. This capped his bonus at $3.557 million and limited him to a rookie salary scale, while the signing team also had to pay a $20 million posting fee to the Fighters. Ohtani narrowed his finalists to seven teams, signing with the Angels for a $2.315 million bonus.

Los Angeles Angels

On December 8, 2017, Ohtani agreed to a deal with the Los Angeles Angels. The deal was finalized the next day. On December 13, it was revealed that Ohtani was diagnosed with a first-degree UCL sprain in his right elbow. He received a platelet-rich plasma injection to treat the injury.

2018: AL Rookie of the Year 

Prior to the start of the season, the Angels announced that they would continue to use Ohtani as both a hitter and a pitcher. Ohtani started as the designated hitter on Opening Day, March 29, against the Oakland Athletics, singling in his first at-bat. On April 1, he made his pitching debut, striking out six batters in six innings while allowing three runs, to pick up his first MLB win. On April 3, Ohtani hit his first MLB home run, a 397-foot three-run homer against Josh Tomlin. On April 6, he hit his third home run in three days, becoming the first Angels rookie to do so. In only his second start on the mound on April 8, Ohtani took a perfect game through 6⅓ innings before allowing a hit. Overall, Ohtani pitched seven scoreless innings while striking out 12. Making his third start pitching on April 18 against the Boston Red Sox, Ohtani exited after two innings due to a blister on his right middle finger. On June 6, Ohtani left the game after a blister on the same finger. Two days later, he was placed on the disabled list for the first time in his MLB career due to a Grade 2 UCL sprain in his right elbow. He received platelet-rich plasma and stem-cell injections to treat the injury.

Ohtani was activated from the disabled list as a hitter on July 2, and went 0-for-4 against the Seattle Mariners. On August 3, Ohtani hit two home runs against the Cleveland Indians, marking his first career multiple-home run game and his first two home runs in a road game.

After Ohtani had not pitched for 11 weeks, Angels manager Mike Scioscia announced that Ohtani would start the game against the Houston Astros on September 2. On September 7, Ohtani broke the MLB home run record by a Japanese rookie when he hit his 19th home run for the season.

Ohtani ended his first major league season with a batting average of .285, a .361 on-base-percentage, 22 home runs, 61 RBIs, and 10 stolen bases. In 10 starts on the mound, he notched a 4–2 record with a 3.31 ERA, 1.16 walks plus hits per inning pitched (WHIP) and 63 strikeouts. His .564 slugging percentage ranked seventh overall among MLB players with at least 350 plate appearances for this season. He became the second-fastest Angels rookie to reach 20 home runs, and he joined Babe Ruth as the only MLB players with 10 pitching appearances and 20 homers in a season. He also won the American League Rookie of the Month award twice; in April and in September.

On September 3, 2018, ESPN announced that doctors recommended that Ohtani undergo Tommy John surgery, after an MRI showed new damage to his UCL. The Angels announced on September 25 that Ohtani had agreed to the procedure, which would keep him off the mound until 2020. On October 1, Angels general manager Billy Eppler announced that Ohtani underwent successful Tommy John surgery. On November 12, he was named the American League Rookie of the Year.

2019 

On May 7, 2019, Ohtani played in his first game with the Angels since undergoing Tommy John surgery, batting as a designated hitter against the Detroit Tigers. In a June 13 game against the Tampa Bay Rays, Ohtani became the first Japanese-born player to hit for the cycle in MLB history. On September 12, Ohtani's 2019 season prematurely ended after it was revealed that he needed surgery to repair a bipartite patella. He finished the season batting .286/.343/.505 with 18 home runs, 62 RBIs, and 12 stolen bases in 106 games.

2020 

The 2020 MLB season did not start until July 24 due to the COVID-19 pandemic. On July 24, 2020, Ohtani was the first ever automatic player on second base in an official MLB game at the start of the 10th inning as part of one of the new 2020 MLB season rules in a game against the Oakland Athletics. He was thrown out in a rundown.

On July 26, 2020, Ohtani returned to the mound against the Oakland Athletics, making his first pitching appearance since September 2018. He allowed five runs and was removed from the mound without recording an out, starting his season with a loss and an infinite ERA. After his second start of the season against the Houston Astros, Ohtani began to experience discomfort in his right arm, and it was eventually revealed that he had a flexor strain in his right elbow after undergoing an MRI. Angels manager Joe Maddon later stated that Ohtani would not pitch for the rest of the season.

On the offensive side, Ohtani finished the season batting .190/.291/.366 with seven home runs, 24 RBIs, and seven stolen bases in 43 games. The culmination of experiencing injuries in his 2019 and 2020 campaigns led to Ohtani describing feeling "frustrated" and "useless". He went on to say that while his 2019 had been disappointing, his 2020 had been "more like pathetic", because he could not pitch or hit the way he wanted to. Ohtani said, "[Until 2019], I could more or less do the things I wanted to do. I'd pretty much never experienced the feeling of wanting to do something but being completely unable to do it."

2021: AL MVP 

After the results of the 2019 and 2020 seasons, Ohtani spent the offseason overhauling himself. He adjusted his diet based on blood-sample analysis and started squatting heavily again, focusing on strengthening his lower half and bulking up to 225 pounds. He threw bullpen sessions earlier than usual and took batting practice against live pitching, an offseason first for him. Ohtani also embraced data and technology to optimize his training and recovery by visiting Driveline Baseball, a popular player-development destination for underperforming pitchers, where he also tinkered with a changeup. Furthermore, in spring training, the Angels general manager Perry Minasian, manager Joe Maddon, and Ohtani agreed to allow Ohtani to play without limitations or restrictions and drop the "Ohtani Rules", a plan the Angels mirrored from Ohtani's schedule in Japan and had implemented since his 2018 rookie season that restricted his usage to a schedule of pitching once a week and hitting only three to four times between starts. Free of the "Ohtani Rules", Ohtani would be in charge of his own daily diagnostics with Maddon to determine his pitching and hitting schedule.

On February 8, Ohtani agreed to a two-year $8.5 million contract with the Angels, avoiding arbitration.

In his first pitching start against the Chicago White Sox on Sunday Night Baseball on April 4, 2021, he threw 4⅔ innings, allowing one earned run and two unearned runs. During that start, he struck out seven batters. Additionally, Ohtani batted second in the lineup. He went 1-for-3, hitting a 450-foot solo home run on the first pitch he faced.

After skipping a scheduled start against the Toronto Blue Jays due to a blister, Ohtani made his second start of the season on April 20, against the Texas Rangers. Under a 75-pitch limit, he threw four scoreless innings, striking out seven batters and allowing one hit. In his third start on April 26, once again against the Texas Rangers, Ohtani collected his first win of the season. He pitched five innings, allowing four runs in the first inning and striking out nine. Offensively, he went 2-for-3 with two RBIs. Ohtani also became the first player in nearly 100 years to start a game on the mound while also entering the day leading the Majors in home runs. Such an event had not occurred since Babe Ruth took the mound as starting pitcher for the Yankees on June 13, 1921, leading the AL with 19 home runs.

All-Star debut 
On June 18, Ohtani was elected to the 2021 Home Run Derby, becoming both the first pitcher and the first Japanese player to do so. Three days later, Ohtani was named AL Player of the Week for the third time in his career after hitting six home runs and picking up a win as starting pitcher. Two weeks later, he was again named AL Player of the Week for the fourth time in his career after hitting six home runs and recording a 1.543 OPS with eight RBIs in six games to help the Angels go 5–1. On June 23, he made history yet again as he hit for himself as a pitcher and the second batter in the lineup against the Giants with designated hitter rules in place, making it the first time in MLB history that an American League team chose not to use a DH while a National League team utilized one.

For the first time in his career, Ohtani was named the American League Player of the Month for June, as he hit .309/.423/.889 with 13 home runs and a 1.312 OPS as a hitter and earned two wins as a pitcher. On July 3 against the Baltimore Orioles, Ohtani became the first player in American League history to reach 30 home runs and 10 stolen bases in the first 81 games of the season.

On July 4, Ohtani made history by becoming the first player to be selected as an All-Star as both a position player and a pitcher. He had already been selected as the starting designated hitter by the fans for the 2021 All-Star Game on July 1, while being voted by the players as one of five starting pitchers to make the American League roster on July 4. On July 7, Ohtani hit his 32nd home run of the year, a solo shot off of Boston Red Sox starter Eduardo Rodríguez, passing Hideki Matsui's mark in 2004, for the most home runs hit during a season by a Japanese-born player in MLB. Additionally, Ohtani won the Best Major League Baseball Player ESPY Award, becoming the first Japanese player to win the award.

Ohtani participated in the Home Run Derby on July 12. In the first round, he hit 22 home runs, tying him with opponent Juan Soto. A tiebreaker round saw Ohtani and Soto tied again at 28 home runs. While Soto won the round after a second tiebreaker, Ohtani set a record for the most home runs in the Derby of at least 500 feet with six. For participating in the Derby, Ohtani received $150,000, which he proceeded to donate his earnings to approximately 30 Angels support employees to thank them for their work, which included trainers, clubhouse workers and media relations staffers. Ohtani had decided that he was going to use the money in this manner no matter what his Derby outcome was.

On July 13, Ohtani made All-Star Game history again as the starting pitcher and leadoff designated hitter for the American League. After pitching a perfect first inning, he also became the first player in major league history to compete in the Home Run Derby and earn a win as the starting pitcher in the All-Star Game.

Two-way season 

On July 26, in his 15th pitching start of the season against the Colorado Rockies, Ohtani became the first pitcher in league history to register 100 strikeouts while holding a major-league-leading 35 home runs before the end of July, as no pitcher had ever recorded triple-digit strikeouts and added more than nine home runs in the same season. Additionally, in the same game, Ohtani became the first pitcher to throw a scoreless top half and record a hit, a RBI, a stolen base and a scored run while playing in an AL ballpark since Luis Tiant did so for the Minnesota Twins on April 26, 1970.

Ohtani would finish the month of July as the first player in Major League history to ever have at least 37 home runs and 15 stolen bases before the end of July. And for the second straight month, Ohtani also earned his second American League Player of the Month Award, becoming the first back-to-back Player of the Month Award winner in either league since Chase Headley in August and September 2012, and the first in the AL since Josh Hamilton in 2012. For the month of July, he produced nine home runs, 19 RBIs, 16 walks and a .282/.396/.671 slash line in 23 games at the plate, and a 1.35 ERA with 17 strikeouts and one walk in 20 innings.

On August 18, Ohtani pitched a dominant 8 innings against the Detroit Tigers, setting a career high by throwing 90 pitches to record 24 outs in eight innings while also hitting a solo homer for his 40th of the year in the eighth inning to lead the Angels to a 3–1 win. He became the first left-handed batter in Angels history to reach 40 home runs, surpassing lefty Reggie Jackson's 1982 record of 39. He also became just the fourth AL pitcher to throw at least eight innings and hit a homer in a game since the DH was instituted in 1973, joining Jon Garland in June 2006, Kris Benson in June 2006, and Bobby Witt in June 1997.

Ohtani would cap off the month of August by stealing his 20th base in a game on August 28 against the San Diego Padres, becoming the first Japanese-born player and the first player in Angels history to hit 40 home runs and have 20 stolen bases in the same season. He joined Alex Rodriguez in 2007 and Ken Griffey Jr. in 1999 as the 3rd AL player to accomplish this feat before September. He also became the first AL player to reach both of those totals in a season since Curtis Granderson in 2011.

On September 21, after hitting his 45th home run of the season, Ohtani became the first player to hit at least 45 homers and steal 20 bases in a season since Alex Rodriguez in 2007. And on September 25, Ohtani joined Willie Mays as the only players with at least 45 home runs, 20 stolen bases and six triples in a season, when he hit two triples in consecutive plate appearances, becoming the first Angels player to do so since Peter Bourjos in April 2011.

From September 22 to 25, Ohtani drew 13 walks in a 4-game span, tying an AL/NL record set by Babe Ruth in 1930, Bryce Harper in 2016, and Yasmani Grandal in 2021. He drew a career-high four walks on September 22 and three walks on September 23, against the Houston Astros, followed by four more walks on September 24 and two walks on September 25 against the Seattle Mariners. His 11 walks drawn in the three game span also tied the MLB record set by Harper in 2016.

MVP award and other honors 

The Angels announced on September 25 that Ohtani was named as both the team's Los Angeles Angels Player of the Year of 2021 and the team's Nick Adenhart Pitcher of the Year Award, as voted by his teammates.

On September 26, Ohtani reached the 150-strikeout milestone against the Seattle Mariners and finished the year unbeaten at home, going 6–0 with a 1.95 ERA in 13 starts. Ohtani's home ERA was the lowest by an Angels starter since Jered Weaver in 2011. He also became the sixth starter in AL or NL history to make at least 13 home starts without a losing decision and an ERA below 2.00 in a season. In the last game of the season against the Seattle Mariners, Ohtani passed teammate Mike Trout's 45 home runs in a single season to finish with the second-most home runs in a season in Angels history at 46, trailing only Troy Glaus' 47 home runs in 2000.

For the year, Ohtani finished his pitching campaign by making 23 starts on the mound, going 9–2 with a 3.18 ERA, 156 strikeouts, 1.09 WHIP and 44 walks in 130 1/3 innings. On the hitting side, Ohtani finished with an American League-leading 20 intentional walks, which was the most by an AL player since Mike Trout in 2018. Ohtani, who batted .257/.372/.592, including 46 home runs — runner-up for the MLB lead in homers, 100 RBI, 103 runs and 26 steals in 155 games and 639 plate appearances, hit several milestones to close his season, reaching both 100 RBIs and 100 runs for the first time in his career. He also tied for the MLB lead with eight triples to go along with 26 stolen bases. Ohtani became the first player in MLB history to have at least 45 homers, 25 stolen bases, 100 RBIs, 100 runs, and eight triples in a season and the second player in AL history to record at least 45 homers and 25 stolen bases in a season, joining Jose Canseco in 1998. According to Baseball-Reference.com, Ohtani led the league with a wins above replacement (WAR) value of 9.1 and finished third in home runs (46), fourth in slugging percentage (.592), fifth in OPS (.965), first in triples (eight), fifth in drawing walks (96), eight in stolen bases (26), second in extra base hits (80), second in intentional walks (20), fifth in OPS+ (158), and first in power-speed number (33.2).

Ohtani was unanimously voted the American League Most Valuable Player, becoming the 23rd pitcher and first designated hitter to win the award. For the 2021 All-MLB Team, Ohtani is the only player to be named to both teams, first team and second team, in the same season (as a designated hitter and starting pitcher respectively). He became the first pitcher, the first Japanese player and the first Angels player to win the Edgar Martínez Outstanding Designated Hitter Award. Ohtani was also awarded the Silver Slugger Award for being the best offensive player at the designated hitter position in the American League, and was named to Time 100's list of most influential people of 2021, which culminated to many end-of-the-season-accolades. He was named Associated Press AP Athlete of the Year, Sporting News Athlete of the Year, Baseball Digest Player of the Year and Baseball America Major League Player of the Year. From his MLB peers he was given Sporting News Player of the Year Award, Players Choice Player of the Year Award, and Players Choice American League Outstanding Player Award.

Additionally, Ohtani's 2021 season was recognized for two Guinness World Records titles: (1) the first MLB player to achieve 100+ innings and record 100+ strikeouts as a pitcher, and 100+ RBIs, hits and runs as a batter in a single season and (2) the first player to start the MLB All-Star Game as a pitcher and a designated hitter. He also became the 16th recipient of the Commissioner's Historic Achievement Award, awarded by Commissioner Rob Manfred, who formally recognized Ohtani's 2021 season as "historically significant" and "unprecedented", calling it "so special that it was important to recognize the historic achievement that took place in 2021 with an award just about 2021." Ohtani was offered Japan's national honor, the People's Honour Award, by the Prime Minister of Japan in recognition of his accomplishments, but Ohtani rejected it, saying it was "still too early" for such an award.

On December 22, 2021, Sporting News released the article "The 50 greatest seasons in sports history, ranked". In it, Ohtani's 2021 season was ranked No.1, topping great seasons by athletes such as Babe Ruth, Michael Jordan, Tom Brady, Wayne Gretzky, and Lionel Messi.

2022

On March 22, 2022, Major League Baseball introduced a new rule that allows for a pitcher in the batting order to remain in the game as a designated hitter after they are pulled from the pitching mound. The rule was colloquially dubbed the "Ohtani rule" because of Ohtani's unique prowess as a two-way player. The rule will enable Ohtani to remain in the game after he is done pitching at his customary designated hitter spot instead of being switched to a defensive position like the outfield, something that he did seven times in 2021.

On March 25, Ohtani was named as the Opening Day starter for the Angels' 2022 season. He pitched  innings against the Houston Astros, allowing one earned run and one walk while striking out 9. He became the first player in MLB history to start Opening Day as both the starting pitcher and the leadoff hitter. During a game against the Astros on April 20, Ohtani batted twice in the top of the first inning, becoming the first starting pitcher to do so since at least 1900. In the same game, Ohtani pitched  perfect innings before giving up a single to former teammate Jason Castro, the only hit of the game for Houston. Ohtani finished the game at 6 innings pitched with 1 hit, no runs, and 1 walk surrendered and 12 strikeouts, tying his career high. On offense, he went 2-4 with a run and 2 RBIs. Pitching against the Texas Rangers on April 14, Ohtani gave up his first-ever career grand slam against Jonah Heim in an eventual 10-5 loss by the Angels. Coincidentally, it was also the first-ever grand slam hit by Heim.

Against the Boston Red Sox on May 5, 2022, Ohtani, while hitting third and making his first career start on the mound at Fenway Park, became the first starting pitcher to bat in one of the top four spots in a game at Fenway since Babe Ruth did so on September 20, 1919. He threw seven scoreless innings with 11 strikeouts in the Angels' 8-0 victory over the Red Sox, while also going 2-for-4 from the plate and a RBI single in the eighth inning to become the second starting pitcher to ever record a hit at Fenway after Roger Clemens in 1996, since the implementation of the designated hitter in 1973. His induced 29 swings and misses became the most registered number of swings and misses in a game for 2022.

Ohtani recorded two home runs, including a grand slam, on May 9, 2022, against the Tampa Bay Rays, marking the second time of the 2022 season and the eighth time in his career for Ohtani to record a multi-homer game, surpassing Ichiro Suzuki for the most by a Japanese-born player in MLB history, while also going 3-for-4 and a career-high five RBIs. The grand slam was the first of his professional career, including both NPB and MLB. On May 14, 2022, Ohtani hit his 100th career MLB home run, making him the third Japanese-born player with at least 100 homers in the majors, trailing only Hideki Matsui with 175 and Ichiro Suzuki with 117. Ohtani also joined Babe Ruth as the only players with at least 100 home runs and at least 250 strikeouts as a pitcher.

On June 9, 2022, Ohtani hit a go-ahead two-run home run and pitched seven innings, including throwing a 101 mph fastball to strike out Rafael Devers to end the third - the hardest strikeout pitch of his career, in a 5-2 win over the Boston Red Sox to end the Angels' 14-game losing streak, the longest in franchise history. The victory resulted in a six game pitching span from June 9 to July 13, where Ohtani went 6-0 with a 0.45 ERA (39.2 IP & 2 ER) and 58 strikeouts, (while also hitting eight HR with a .997 OPS), while becoming the fourth pitcher all-time to go 6-0 with 58+ SO and 2-or-fewer ER in a six-game span, joining Cy Young winners Johan Santana (2004), R.A. Dickey (2012) and Clayton Kershaw (2014).

In a two game span from June 21–22, 2022, Ohtani made MLB history by becoming the first player in the American League or National League to have at least eight RBIs in a game and strike out at least 10 batters the next day. On June 21, Ohtani hit a pair of three-run homers and set a career-high with eight RBIs, becoming the first player born in Japan to have eight RBI in a game and just the eighth player in Angels history to have eight RBIs in a game. Ohtani's eight RBIs were the most by an Angels player since Garret Anderson had a franchise-record 10 RBIs against the New York Yankees on August 21, 2007. It was also the most RBIs in a game by a Japanese-born player, surpassing seven-RBI games from Hideki Matsui in 2009 and Tadahito Iguchi in 2006. The following day, Ohtani set another career high with 13 strikeouts over eight scoreless innings to help lift the Angels to a 5-0 win over the Kansas City Royals, becoming the 19th player in Angels history with 13 strikeouts in a game and the first since Patrick Sandoval on July 24, 2021, against the Minnesota Twins. 

On July 6, 2022, against the Miami Marlins, Ohtani made MLB history again by becoming the first player since RBI became an official statistic in 1920 to record 10 strikeouts as a pitcher, two RBIs as a batter, and a stolen base all in a single game. His 111 strikeouts over 81 innings pitched in the game made him the first Angels pitcher to record 110 K's in the first half in fewer than 100 innings and the first Angels pitcher to 110 K's in the first half since Garrett Richards in 2014. He also became the fourth Angels player with multiple seasons of 15 home runs and 10 stolen bases prior to the All-Star break and the eighth Major Leaguer since earned runs were official in 1913 to record 40-plus strikeouts and zero earned runs in a four-start span.

2nd All-Star 
For a second straight year, Ohtani was voted in to the All-Star Game by fans as the starter at the designated hitter position on July 8 and on July 10 he was selected as a starting pitcher again, making history as the only player to be selected as an All-Star as both a position player and a pitcher twice. Ohtani announced; however, that he would only participate as a hitter in the All Star Game, even though he was considered as a candidate to start for the AL team. Ohtani declined to pitch, citing a scheduling conflict and his preference to "prioritize the season over the All-Star Game."

In a game against the Oakland Athletics where he pitched and hit, Ohtani completed three historical feats on August 9, 2022. Ohtani joined Babe Ruth in an exclusive 10-homer, 10-win club; moved up on the all-time home run list for Japanese-born players; and set a single-season career high in strikeouts. Ohtani tossed six scoreless innings to earn his 10th win of the season for the first time in his Major League career. He and Babe Ruth are the only two players in AL and NL history to win at least 10 games on the mound and hit at least 10 home runs in the same season. Ed Rile and Bullet Rogan also accomplished this feat in the Negro leagues as well. Ohtani's 25th home run of the season was his 118th career home run, which surpassed Ichiro Suzuki's 117 career home runs to become second place on the all-time Major League home run list for Japanese-born players. Ohtani's five strikeouts in the game brought him to 157 on the season, a new single-season high eclipsing his 2021 total of 156. Combined with his playing days in Nippon Professional Baseball, Ohtani reached 1,000 strikeouts between NPB (624) and MLB (379). 

Against the New York Yankees on August 30, Ohtani launched a go-ahead three-run home run off Yankees ace Gerrit Cole in the sixth inning to become the only player in MLB history with 10+ pitching wins and 30+ HR in the same season. Ohtani had a career-best, team-leading 18-game hit streak that began on September 14 and ended on October 3. 

The Angels avoided arbitration with Ohtani on October 1, signing Ohtani to a one-year deal worth $30 million for the 2023 season. At $30 million, the deal set a new record for a player in his third year of arbitration, surpassing the $27 million Mookie Betts received before the 2020 season and also gives Ohtani the biggest salary raise of any arbitration-eligible player; a $24.5 million raise from his 2022 salary of $5.5 million and $3 million of 2021. 

On October 5, Ohtani pitched five innings in a loss to the Oakland Athletics, becoming the first player in the modern era to qualify for both the hitting and pitching leaderboards in one season, reaching the limits of 3.1 plate appearances and one inning pitched per game.

Ohtani finished his 2022 season with a 15–9 record, a 2.33 ERA and 219 strikeouts in 166 innings. He also hit .273/.356/.519 with 34 homers, 30 doubles, 11 stolen bases, and 95 RBIs in 157 games. Among AL pitchers, Ohtani finished the year first in SO/9 innings rate (11.87), third in strikeouts (219), fourth in ERA (2.33) and tied for fourth in wins (15), while amongst AL hitters, Ohtani ranked fourth in homers (34), fifth in OPS (.875), fifth in total bases (304), third in intentional walks (14), tied for third in extra-base hits (70), fifth in slugging (.519), tied for fourth in triples (6), seventh in RBIs (95), seventh in walks (72), and tied for eighth in runs (90). Ohtani also led the majors with a home-to-first average time of 4.09 seconds, and was the only player in the majors to tally at least six triples and 34 home runs in 2022 (making him the only player to do so in a second consecutive year). He hit a ball with the highest exit velocity in major league baseball for the season, at 119.1 mph. He also had the fastest speed running from home plate to first base, at 4.09 seconds.

The Angels announced that Ohtani was once again named as both the team's Los Angeles Angels Player of the Year of 2022 and the team's Nick Adenhart Pitcher of the Year Award, as voted by his teammates.

Additionally in October, the term "Ohtani rule" was added to Dictionary.com as an official entry in their lexicon.

International career

2012 WBSC U-18 Baseball World Cup 
Ohtani was selected to Japan's Under-18 National Team that eventually finished in sixth place at the 2012 18U Baseball World Championship 18U Baseball World Championship in Seoul.

2015 WBSC Premier12
In the 2015 Premier12, Ohtani earned a bronze medal with the Samurai Japan National Baseball Team. He was the ace of Japan's pitching staff, which featured Kenta Maeda. As the number one starter, Ohtani made two pitching appearances for Japan, both against the Republic of Korea, winning Game 1 of the opening round and getting a no-decision in the semifinals. Ohtani was subsequently named to the 2015 World Baseball Softball Confederation All-World Team and was named the 2015 WBSC Baseball Player of the Year.

2017 World Baseball Classic
Ohtani was on the 28-man roster for the Japan National Baseball Team of the 2017 World Baseball Classic, but was forced to withdraw due to an ankle injury.

2023 World Baseball Classic
Ohtani is playing for the Japan National Baseball Team in the 2023 World Baseball Classic. He was named the Pool B MVP for his hitting and pitching performances in the group stage of the tournament.

Awards and achievements

Awards and exhibition team selections

 MLB
 American League Most Valuable Player (2021)
 Commissioner's Historic Achievement Award (2021)
 2× American League Player of the Month (June 2021, July 2021)
 4× American League Player of the Week (April 8, 2018; September 9, 2018; June 20, 2021; July 4, 2021)
 2× Major League Baseball All-Star Game selection (2021, 2022)
 American League Rookie of the Year (2018)
 Silver Slugger Award at Designated Hitter (2021)
 Edgar Martínez Outstanding Designated Hitter Award (2021)
 2× Los Angeles Angels Player of the Year (2021, 2022)
 2× Nick Adenhart Pitcher of the Year Award (2021, 2022)
 Players Choice Award for Player of the Year (2021)
 Players Choice Award for American League Outstanding Player (2021)

 Media 
 Associated Press AP Athlete of the Year (2021)
 Baseball America Major League Player of the Year (2021)
 Baseball America Rookie of the Year Award (2018)
 Baseball Digest Player of the Year (2021)
 Sporting News Athlete of the Year (2021)
 Sporting News MLB Player of the Year Award (2021)
 Sporting News Rookie of the Year Award (2018)
 3× ESPY Award winner
 2× Best Major League Baseball Player (2021, 2022)
 Best Male Athlete (2022)
 Topps All-Star Rookie team (2018)

Statistical achievements

Playing style

Pitching
He posted a walks per nine innings rate of 3.3 across his NPB career. Ohtani has been compared to Justin Verlander by some MLB scouts with his ability and affinity to throwing harder in high-leverage spots and later in games. Whereas most pitchers throw only a little harder in big spots than they do in normal ones and most pitchers lose speed as the game goes on, Ohtani, like Verlander, are both able to reserve power and staying power in order to conserve energy without throwing max effort on every offering.

Batting and fielding
Ohtani is a left-handed batter. He is a designated hitter and occasional outfielder known for being able to hit with homerun power. As a baserunner, Ohtani's sprint speed and feet-first sliding technique have allowed him to be a league leader in stolen bases, bunt hits and infield-hit rate. Scouts have timed Ohtani running from the batter's box to first base in as little as 3.8 seconds. For the 2021 season, his 28.8 feet-per-second sprint speed ranked in the 92nd percentile of all players, as did his 3.51 second 80-foot split and he also recorded the fastest home to first average sprint time in the Majors at 4.09 seconds, while recording a career-high 26 stolen bases.

Personal life
Since gaining national and international attention as a high school phenom, Ohtani is one of Japan's most celebrated athletes and has faced intense media pressure scrutiny with the Japanese press his whole adult life. Due to the high-profile nature of his two-way efforts, the Fighters protected Ohtani from some of the media onslaught, while Ohtani tended to keep to the team dormitory and the gym, leading a semi-monastic, baseball-centric existence, a byproduct for holding down two jobs in the big leagues and doing both at an elite level.

While not fluent, Ohtani can speak English and knows Spanish, but prefers to speak to the media through an interpreter, translating his native Japanese to English. Ippei Mizuhara is Ohtani's personal interpreter with the Los Angeles Angels and has known him since Ohtani was 18, starting in 2013 during Ohtani's days with the Fighters. Mizuhara's role as Ohtani's personal interpreter ranges from confidante to conditioning coach and throwing partner, to making sure Ohtani understands, and is understood. The interpreter steps into any number of sub-duties, including Ohtani's agenda—preparation, play, recovery, media availability, breaking down advanced analytics and recovery timetables between Ohtani and the Angels organization. After Ohtani joined the Angels, Mizuhara suggested to Ohtani, as an icebreaker, to combine his hobby of playing video games by downloading Clash Royale with the rest of the clubhouse.

When Ohtani announced in September 2017 that he wanted to pursue a career in MLB, he signed with CAA Sports for representation. Ohtani is represented by agent Nez Balelo of CAA Sports since 2017. Ohtani was listed in Forbes 30 under 30 Asia class of 2018 in the field of Entertainment & Sports.

For his historic campaign in 2021, Ohtani was named to Time 100's list of most influential people of 2021  and awarded the Commissioner's Historic Achievement Award by Commissioner Rob Manfred. Additionally, Ohtani's 2021 season was recognized for two Guinness World Records titles: (1) the first MLB player to achieve 100+ innings and record 100+ strikeouts as a pitcher, and 100+ RBIs, hits and runs as a batter in a single season and (2) the first player to start the MLB All-Star Game as a pitcher and a designated hitter. Ohtani was also offered Japan's national honor, the People's Honour Award, by the Prime Minister of Japan in recognition of his accomplishments, but Ohtani rejected it, saying it was "still too early" for such an award.

Endorsements

In August 2022, Ohtani became a brand ambassador for Porsche Japan as part of their 'Porsche Driving Athlete' family.

, Ohtani endorsement earnings tripled from 2021 to an estimated MLB league-leading $20 million off the field, proving to be a marketing hit on both sides of the Pacific, with a group of 15 partnerships that included renewals among his partners Fanatics, Topps and Panini in the U.S. and Asics, Descente and Hugo Boss in Japan, as well as new deals with FTX, Kowa, Mitsubishi Bank and Salesforce.

Ohtani is the cover athlete of MLB The Show 22 and is the first Asian player to be featured as the cover star of MLB: The Show. On February 9, 2022, Ohtani appeared in the Nintendo Direct to promote MLB The Show 22, as it was the first installment in the franchise to appear on a Nintendo console. In the direct, two versions of Ohtani, one in hitting gear, the other in pitching gear, stood side by side holding devices. The use of Ohtani to promote it was seen as tying to his Japanese nationality, as Nintendo is based in Japan.

On July 20, 2021, Ohtani signed an exclusive multiyear memorabilia deal with Fanatics.

In 2021, Ohtani had an estimated MLB league-leading $6 million in annual endorsement deals, which included Asics, Descente, Japan Airlines, Nishikawa Co., and Seiko Watch in Japan and Hugo Boss, New Era, Panini, Fanatics, Oakley and Topps in the United States. On November 16, 2021, it was announced that Ohtani joined cryptocurrency exchange FTX as a global ambassador, partnering on various animal charitable initiatives. In November 2022, FTX filed for bankruptcy, wiping out billions of dollars in customer funds. Ohtani, alongside other spokespeople, is currently being sued for promoting unregistered securities through a class-action lawsuit. In February 2022, the U.S. 11th Circuit Court of Appeals ruled in a lawsuit against Bitconnect that the Securities Act of 1933 extends to targeted solicitation using social media.

In 2023, it was announced that Ohtani was now an ambassador for New Balance, and would wear their gear on the field. Ohtani had previously worn exclusive Asics gear on field, before making the transition to New Balance.

See also

 List of Major League Baseball annual home run leaders
 List of Major League Baseball annual triples leaders
 List of Major League Baseball players from Japan
 Major League Baseball Player of the Week Award
 Major League Baseball Rookie of the Month Award
 Major League Baseball Rookie of the Year Award
 Sporting News Rookie of the Year Award
 List of Major League Baseball players to hit for the cycle
 All MLB Team

Notes

References

Further reading

External links

1994 births
Living people
American League All-Stars
American League Most Valuable Player Award winners
Hokkaido Nippon-Ham Fighters players
Japanese expatriate baseball players in the United States
Los Angeles Angels players
Major League Baseball designated hitters
Major League Baseball pitchers
Major League Baseball players from Japan
Major League Baseball Rookie of the Year Award winners
Nippon Professional Baseball designated hitters
Nippon Professional Baseball MVP Award winners
Nippon Professional Baseball outfielders
Nippon Professional Baseball pitchers
Baseball people from Iwate Prefecture
People from Ōshū, Iwate
Silver Slugger Award winners
2015 WBSC Premier12 players
2023 World Baseball Classic players